Sibongile Mlambo is a Zimbabwean actress based in the United States. She is known for starring in Netflix’s Lost in Space, the Starz historical adventure television series Black Sails and in films Honey 3 and The Last Face. She is also best known for her role as Tamora Monroe on the MTV television series Teen Wolf, as Donna on the Freeform television series Siren, and voicing Melusi in the Ubisoft multiplayer game Tom Clancy's Rainbow Six Siege.

Early life
Mlambo was born in Zimbabwe, and her father is a doctor. Mlambo has an older sister who is also an actress. Mlambo left Zimbabwe in 2005 to pursue her education in the United States and has lived in Texas, New York and briefly in Spain. In 2011, Mlambo was living in South Africa, working in Johannesburg and Cape Town. Mlambo later moved back to the United States, settling in Los Angeles.

Mlambo studied French and Spanish at Southern Methodist University and has a dance background.

Career

Modelling
Mlambo has been the face of Nivea campaigns across Africa and is represented by Ice Genetics in Cape Town. In 2007, Mlambo was the second princess in Miss Zim-USA 2007.

Acting
She starred as Eme in Starz network's show Black Sails and starred as one of the leads, Ishani in Honey 3 next to Cassie Ventura and Kenny Wormald from Footloose.

She also starred in the movie The Last Face as Assatu, and was Chadwick Boseman’s sister, Bianca, in the feature film Message From The King.

In 2018, Mlambo worked in the TV series Siren as Donna.

In 2021, Mlambo guest-starred in the "Painkiller" episode of Black Lightning as Maya Odell.

Filmography

Film

Television

Awards and nominations

References

External links
 
 

Living people
1987 births
21st-century American actresses
Zimbabwean television actresses
Zimbabwean film actresses
Zimbabwean models
Southern Methodist University
21st-century Zimbabwean actresses
Expatriate actresses in the United States
Zimbabwean expatriates in the United States